South Sea Tales (1911) is a collection of short stories written by Jack London.  Most stories are set in island communities, like those of Hawaii, or are set aboard a ship.

List of Stories
The House of Mapuhi
The Whale Tooth
Mauki
"Yah! Yah! Yah!"
The Heathen
The Terrible Solomons
The Inevitable White Man
The Seed of McCoy

References

External links
 

Short story collections by Jack London
1911 short story collections
Books about Oceania
Historical short story collections
Macmillan Publishers books
Oceania in fiction